Austropenaeus is a monotypic genus of deepwater prawn. Its only species is Austropenaeus nitidus which is native to the deep water surrounding South Africa.

References

Dendrobranchiata
Monotypic decapod genera
Taxa named by Keppel Harcourt Barnard